Perezville is an unincorporated community and census-designated place in Hidalgo County, Texas, United States. Its population was 5,376 as of the 2010 census. Prior to 2010, the community was part of the Abram-Perezville census-designated place along with nearby Abram.

Geography

Education
Perezville is served by the La Joya Independent School District. Schools serving the CDP include:
 Elementary: Guillermo Flores, Henry B. Gonzáles, JFK, and E.B. Reyna
 Middle: C. Chavez, Irene Garcia, and A. Richards
 La Joya High School.

References

Unincorporated communities in Hidalgo County, Texas
Unincorporated communities in Texas
Census-designated places in Hidalgo County, Texas
Census-designated places in Texas